Affin Bank Berhad d.b.a. AFFIN BANK is the Financial Holding Company of Affin Islamic Bank Berhad, Affin Hwang Investment Bank Berhad, Affin Moneybrokers Sdn Bhd, AXA AFFIN Life Insurance Berhad and AXA AFFIN General Insurance Berhad of Affin Bank Berhad.

AFFIN BANK provides a suite of financial products and services that is catered to both retail and corporate customers. The target business segments are categorized under key business units such as Community Banking, Enterprise Banking, Corporate Banking and Treasury. As at 31 December 2020, AFFIN BANK has a network of 115 branches in Malaysia.

Affin Islamic Bank Berhad (AFFIN ISLAMIC), a wholly owned subsidiary of AFFIN BANK commenced operations on 1 April 2006 as a full-fledged Islamic bank, and offers a complete range of Islamic Banking products and services for individuals and corporate which are in compliance with Shariah Principles and Laws.

See also
List of banks
List of banks in Malaysia

References

1975 establishments in Malaysia
Banks established in 1975
Banks of Malaysia
Companies listed on Bursa Malaysia
Companies based in Kuala Lumpur